Articled clerk is a title used in Commonwealth countries for one who is studying to be an accountant or a lawyer. In doing so, they are put under the supervision of someone already in the profession, now usually for two years, but previously three to five years was common. This can be compared as being an intern for a company. Trainees are obligated to sign a contract agreeing to the terms of being an articled clerk. The articled clerk signs a contract, known as "articles of clerkship", committing to a fixed period of employment. Wharton's Law Lexicon defines an articled clerk as "a pupil of a solicitor, who undertakes, by articles of clerkship, continuing covenants, mutually binding, to instruct him in the principles and practice of the profession". The contract is with a specific partner in the firm and not with the firm as a whole.

Now, some professions in some countries prefer to use the term "students" or "trainees" (e.g. a trainee solicitor) and the articles of clerkship "training contracts" through process of Experiential Education.

Apprentice architects can also be articled. Henry Percy Adams articled to Britwen Binyon (1846–1909), architect.

Canada 
Canadian lawyers must pass a period of experiential training after graduating from law school, either through 10 months of articles or by completing an alternative program developed by the province of the bar they seek to be called. Depending on the province, students may also be required to pass a bar exam in the form of Professional Legal Training and Certification during their year of articles.

India 
In India, after clearing their initial exams students of chartered accountancy are required to registered themselves with a partner of a firm registered with the Institute of Chartered Accountants of India. They must serve their articles for a period of 18 months, followed by industrial training for 2.5–3 years.

However these young boys and girls are also subject to utmost mental and physical stress in the name of learning. The Institute has never heeded the many complaints that have come their way because, they too believe in propagating the so called tradition of using young learners as bonded labourers, mostly at meagre amount of stipend, which is more often lower than the Rs 9000/month minimum legal pay for unskilled labourers in India. Just because the article clerk faces this as a learner he/she assumes such torture to be morally justified just like ragging is among engineering students in India.

Sri Lanka 
In Sri Lanka, student members of the Institute of Chartered Accountants of Sri Lanka are required to serve as a clerk serving under articles with a member of the Institute in practice or with a member of the Institute who is a salaried employee in the service of a firm of accountants for a minimum three-year practical training period. They are known as articled clerks during this period.

References
Notes

Bibliography

Further reading 
 Lorig, Arthur N. "Training Accountants in Great Britain." The Accounting Review 35, no. 3 (1960): 455-63. https://www.jstor.org/stable/242581.
 Schindler, James S. "A Comparative Study of Certain Accounting Institutions and Practice in England and the United States." Accounting Review 34, no. 4 (October 1959): 634.

Legal professions
Solicitors
Lawyers by type
Accounting in the United Kingdom
Accounting in Sri Lanka